Thomas Randall Mann Jr. (born September 27, 1991) is an American actor. He is known for his roles in the films Project X (2012), Hansel & Gretel: Witch Hunters (2013), Me and Earl and the Dying Girl (2015), Kong: Skull Island (2017), and Halloween Kills (2021).

Early life
Mann was born in Portland, Oregon, and grew up in Dallas, Texas. His father is a construction project manager, and his mother is a nurse. Mann attended Plano East Senior High School briefly before moving to California at the age of 17 to pursue acting.

Acting career

Early work
In 2009, Mann made his acting debut on the Nickelodeon sitcom television series iCarly portraying the role of Jeffrey. Later in the year, Mann appeared in The Middle portraying the role of Brendan Nichols.

In 2010, Mann was cast as the protagonist in the comedy film Project X. Mann was told he could not audition because producers only wished to cast people without acting credits; Mann was ultimately given the role after auditioning 7 times. The film centers on Mann's character, Thomas Kub, who throws a house party for his birthday that becomes totally out of hand. Filming began in June that same year in Los Angeles, California on a $12 million budget. A planned sequel was in development in 2012.

In March 2012, Mann was in final negotiations to star in a film adaptation of the novel King Dork. It was optioned in November 2006 by Gary Sanchez Productions, a joint production company founded by Will Ferrell and Adam McKay. The same year, Mann appeared in the film Fun Size alongside Victoria Justice portraying the role of Roosevelt. The film was released in the United States on October 26, and was both a box office bomb and a critical flop.

Throughout 2013, Mann appeared in Hansel & Gretel: Witch Hunters portraying the role of Ben. The film was released in the U.S. on January 25. That same year, Mann appeared in Beautiful Creatures, a film adaption of the book with the same name. Mann appeared alongside Viola Davis and Emma Thompson, portraying the role of Link. The film was released on February 14, and grossed $60 million worldwide against a budget of $60 million. Mann later appeared in As Cool As I Am alongside Sarah Bolger and James Marsden. The film was released on June 21, by IFC Films.

Breakthrough: 2015–present
Mann starred in many films in 2015. He began starring in the film adaptation of Jesse Andrews' novel, Me and Earl and the Dying Girl, which premiered on January 25 at the 2015 Sundance Film Festival. The film was acquired by Fox Searchlight for $12 million, which was the most money paid for a film at the festival, and was released on June 12 in the U.S. That same year, Mann appeared in The Stanford Prison Experiment, which also premiered at the same Sundance Film Festival; Mann portrayed the role of Prisoner 416. The film began a limited release on July 17 by IFC Films. Mann also appeared in Barely Lethal, also starring Sophie Turner and Hailee Steinfeld, was released on May 29 in a limited release and through VOD by DirecTV Cinema and A24. Then he starred as Tobias Hammell in the drama The Preppie Connection. The film is about Mann's character, a student at a private school, using connections to start a drug trafficking network at the school.

In 2016, he starred as Matt in Some Freaks, a teen romance, Blood Father, opposite William H. Macy and Mel Gibson, and the drama Brain on Fire, alongside Chloë Grace Moretz and Jenny Slate.

In 2017, Mann played Reg Slivko in the fantasy action film Kong: Skull Island, and appeared alongside Bella Thorne in Amityville: The Awakening. After a 3-year delay, the film was released for free on Google Play. Then he appeared in the acclaimed Fargo episode "The Law of Non-Contradiction."

In 2019, Mann played Ted Hinton in John Lee Hancock's drama film The Highwaymen, which was released on Netflix in March of the same year.

In 2021, Mann was announced as starring in a remake of the Soviet television film The Irony of Fate titled About Fate. Filming was scheduled to begin in Boston in June 2021 and the film was released in 2022.

Filmography

Film

Television

Awards and nominations

References

External links
 

1991 births
21st-century American male actors
American male film actors
American male television actors
Living people
Male actors from Dallas
Male actors from Portland, Oregon